Las Piedras, is a town and municipality in east Puerto Rico located in the central eastern region of the island, north of Yabucoa; south of Canóvanas and Río Grande; east of Juncos and San Lorenzo; and west of Naguabo and Humacao. Las Piedras is spread over 7 barrios and Las Piedras Pueblo (the downtown area and the administrative center of the city). It is part of the San Juan-Caguas-Guaynabo Metropolitan Statistical Area.

Las Piedras has many natural attractions such as Cueva del Indio which contains original Taino caves and paintings that denote some characteristics of the island's natives. Las Piedras is located about 45 minutes from San Juan, Puerto Rico's capital and 5 minutes from Palmas del Mar, Humacao which is one of the biggest resorts in the Caribbean.

El Toro, the highest point in the Sierra de Luquillo, is located in the boundary between the municipalities of Las Piedras and Río Grande.

History
Las Piedras was founded in 1793.

Puerto Rico was ceded by Spain in the aftermath of the Spanish–American War under the terms of the Treaty of Paris of 1898 and became a territory of the United States. In 1899, the United States Department of War conducted a census of Puerto Rico finding that the population of Las Piedras was 8,602.

On September 20, 2017 Hurricane Maria struck Puerto Rico. In Las Piedras, 500 residences lost their roof. The hurricane triggered numerous landslides in Las Piedras with 205 mph winds and significant rainfall. Infrastructure in Las Piedras was heavily damaged and most regions were inaccessible immediately following the hurricane.

Geography 
Las Piedras is on the eastern side of Puerto Rico but not on the coast.

Barrios
Like all municipalities of Puerto Rico, Las Piedras is subdivided into barrios.

Boquerón
Ceiba
Collores
El Río
Las Piedras barrio-pueblo
Montones
Quebrada Arenas
Tejas

Sectors
Barrios (which are like minor civil divisions) and subbarrios, in turn, are further subdivided into smaller local populated place areas/units called sectores (sectors in English). The types of sectores may vary, from normally sector to urbanización to reparto to barriada to residencial, among others.

Special Communities

 (Special Communities of Puerto Rico) are marginalized communities whose citizens are experiencing a certain amount of social exclusion. A map shows these communities occur in nearly every municipality of the commonwealth. Of the 742 places that were on the list in 2014, the following barrios, communities, sectors, or neighborhoods were in Las Piedras: Quebrada Grande neighborhood, Rivera neighborhood (Hoyo Gardens), Boquerón, Cinco Cuerdas, El Cerrito, Fondo del Saco, Lijas and Pueblito del Río.

Demographics

Tourism

Landmarks and places of interest
La Cueva del Indio
Monte del Retiro
Artesanial Walk
Francisco Negrón Park
Las Piedras Historic Museum
Panoramic Route 917

Economy

Industry
Manufacturing: computers and pharmaceutical.

Culture

Festivals and events
Las Piedras celebrates its patron saint festival in December. The  is a religious and cultural celebration that generally features parades, games, artisans, amusement rides, regional food, and live entertainment.

Other festivals and events celebrated in Las Piedras include:
Güiro Festival - March
Folk Culture Festival – April
Cross Festival – May
Youth Festival – July
Folk Festival – September
 - October
Roast Pig Festival – November

Government

Like all municipalities in Puerto Rico, Las Piedras is administered by a mayor. The current mayor is Mickey Lopez, from the New Progressive Party (PNP). Lopez was elected at the Puerto Rican general election, 2008 -present general election.

The city belongs to the Puerto Rico Senatorial district VII, which is represented by two senators. In 2012, Jorge Suárez and José Luis Dalmau were elected as District Senators.

Transportation
There are 24 bridges in Las Piedras.

Symbols
The  has an official flag and coat of arms.

Flag
The flag of Las Piedras has three horizontal stripes of equal width, the stripe at the top is colored white, the center stripe is colored green and the bottom stripe is colored blue. In the middle of the flag rests an image of the Taíno sun in yellow.

Coat of arms
In a silver field resides a blue monogram of the Holy Virgin, topped by a blue crown. Seven silver stones border the silver field and at the tip of the shield resides the Taíno sun in gold denominated as the "Sun of Las Piedras".

Notable natives
 Juan Manuel Lebrón - Comedian
 Miguel Hernández Agosto - Puerto Rico Senate President (1988-1992).
 Nicky Cruz - evangelist, reformed gang leader, author of bestselling book, "Run Baby Run".

See also

List of Puerto Ricans
History of Puerto Rico
Did you know-Puerto Rico?

References

External links
Las Piedras and its barrios, United States Census Bureau
Puerto Rico Government Directory - Las Piedras

Further reading 
 

 
Municipalities of Puerto Rico